Carlos Andrés Escobar Casarin (born September 13 of 1990 in Santiago, Chile) is a Chilean former footballer who played as a defender. He debuted playing for Universidad de Chile against Palestino in 2009.

Honours

Club
Universidad de Chile
Primera División de Chile (2): 2009 Apertura, 2011–A

External links
 BDFA profile

1990 births
Living people
Chilean footballers
Footballers from Santiago
Universidad de Chile footballers
San Luis de Quillota footballers
Unión Temuco footballers
Deportes Concepción (Chile) footballers
Chilean Primera División players
Primera B de Chile players
Association football defenders